Best Bit is an EP released by Beth Orton, prior to her 1999 release Central Reservation. It contains two songs performed with Terry Callier, which are covers of Fred Neil's "Dolphins", and Callier's own "Lean on me". The title track appears in an alternative version on Orton's own single, "She Cries Your Name". It peaked at #36 in the UK official singles chart. The cover was photographed by Sam Harris. The video was directed by Steve Hanft.

Track listing

CD: Heavenly HVN 72CD United Kingdom 
 "Best Bit" (Orton) - 4:15
 "Skimming Stone" (Orton, Blanchard, Olsen, Barnes, Read) - 5:48
 "Dolphins" (Fred Neil) - 4:16
 "Lean on Me" (Terry Callier) - 5:06

CD: Dedicated 61702-44020-2 United States 
 "Best Bit" (Orton) - 4:15
 "Skimming Stone" (Orton, Blanchard, Olsen, Barnes, Read) - 5:48
 "Dolphins" (Fred Neil) - 4:16
 "Lean on Me" (Terry Callier) - 5:06
 "Touch Me with Your Love (Live version)" (Barnes, Friend, Orton) - 5:14

 Track 5 was recorded live on the "Morning Becomes Eclectic" radio show off KCRW-FM in Santa Monica, on 30 May 1997.

References 

1997 EPs
Beth Orton albums
Albums produced by Youth (musician)